The Pleasure Buyers is a 1925 American silent mystery drama film directed by Chester Withey and starring Irene Rich, Clive Brook, and Gayne Whitman. It was made by Warner Bros. In 1926 it was released in Britain by Gaumont British Distributors.

Plot
As described in a film magazine review, Gene Cassenas, a careless gambler, is engaged to Helen Ripley. In an effort to save Helen from Gene's fascination, Joan Wiswell arouses his antagonism. After an exciting night here he quarrels with several different persons, Gene is shot fatally while sitting at his Palm Beach home by someone hidden in the dark outside. Former police commissioner Tad Workman is called in to investigate. Six persons are under investigation: a valet, society beauty Joan, her brother Tommy, former business associate Terry, fiancée Helen, and the latter's father. Suspicion regarding the murder falls on Joan because of the argument. After investigation, it is shown that the valet rigged a wall clock to fire a gun at a certain time. With Joan cleared, she and Tad are free to marry.

Cast

Preservation status
A print of The Pleasure Buyers is held at Museum of Modern Art.

References

Bibliography
 Goble, Alan. The Complete Index to Literary Sources in Film. Walter de Gruyter, 1999.

External links

1925 films
1925 drama films
1925 crime films
1925 mystery films
American crime films
American mystery drama films
Films directed by Chester Withey
American silent feature films
Warner Bros. films
American black-and-white films
1920s English-language films
1920s American films
Silent American drama films
Silent mystery drama films